van der Vyver is an Afrikaans surname. Notable people with the surname include:

Johan D. van der Vyver (born 1934), South African academic
Syd van der Vyver (1920–1989), South African racing driver
Wilhelm van der Vyver (born 1989), South African sprinter

Afrikaans-language surnames
Surnames of Dutch origin